Mošćenica is a village in Croatia, administratively located in the Town of Petrinja. It is connected by the D37 state road.

Populated places in Sisak-Moslavina County